German submarine U-511 was a Type IXC U-boat of Nazi Germany's Kriegsmarine during World War II. The submarine was laid down on 21 February 1941 at the Deutsche Werft yard in Hamburg as yard number 307, launched on 22 September 1941 and commissioned on 8 December 1941 under the command of Kapitänleutnant Friedrich Steinhoff.

After training with the 4th U-boat Flotilla, from May 1942, U-511 was used for testing the possibility of launching Wurfkörper 42  artillery rockets from U-boats. However, the rockets were not particularly accurate and the racks on the deck had a negative effect on the U-boat's underwater handling and performance, so the project was abandoned.

The U-boat was attached to the 10th U-boat Flotilla for front-line service on 1 August 1942. In that role she carried out four war patrols, two commanded by Kptlt. Steinhoff, and two by Kptlt.

The U-boat was transferred to Japan on 16 September 1943 and served in the Imperial Japanese Navy as submarine Ro-500 (呂500) until August 1945 when she surrendered to the Allies.

Design
German Type IXC submarines were slightly larger than the original Type IXBs. U-511 had a displacement of  when at the surface and  while submerged. She had two shafts and two  propellers.

U-511 was fitted with six  torpedo tubes (four fitted at the bow and two at the stern), 22 torpedoes, one  SK C/32 naval gun, 180 rounds, and a  SK C/30 as well as a  C/30 anti-aircraft gun. The boat had a complement of forty-eight.

Service history

First patrol
On 16 July 1942	U-511 sailed from Kiel and across the Atlantic to the Caribbean Sea.

The 13,031 GRT British tanker San Fabian, loaded with 18,000 tons of fuel oil, was hit and sunk. The master, 31 crewmen and one gunner were picked up by the destroyer  and the patrol craft , 23 crew members and three gunners were lost. The 8,968  GRT Dutch tanker Rotterdam, carrying 11,364 tons of gasoline was struck and immediately began to settle by the stern. This allowed the ship, in danger of breaking in two, to proceed under her own power to Guantánamo Bay, arriving the next day. The ship was beached and her cargo unloaded. After temporary repairs the ship proceeded to Galveston, Texas, and was returned to service in February 1943.

The U-boat arrived at her new home port of Lorient in occupied France, on 29 September after a voyage lasting 76 days.

Second patrol
U-511 sailed from Lorient on 24 October 1942, and patrolled the waters off the coast of north-west Africa before returning to base after 36 days, on 28 November, having had no successes.

Third patrol
U-511, now under the command of Oberleutnant zur See Fritz Schneewind, left Lorient once more on 31 December 1942 to patrol the waters between Spain, the Canary Islands and the Azores. At 21:42 on 9 January 1943 she had her only success, sinking the 5,004 GRT British merchant ship William Wilberforce, loaded with 5,054 tons of West African produce, including palm kernels, palm oil and rubber en route from Lagos to Liverpool. The unescorted ship was torpedoed west of the Canary Islands, with the loss of three crewmen. The master, 41 crewmen, six gunners and 12 passengers were later picked up by the Spanish merchant ship Monte Arnabal.

U-511 returned to Lorient on 8 March after 68 days at sea.

Fourth patrol
U-511s final patrol took her all the way to Japan, as part of the ongoing programme of technological exchange. She had aboard additional personnel, including the German ambassador to Tokyo, the Japanese naval attaché in Berlin and German scientists and engineers. Leaving Lorient on 10 May 1943 under the command of the now Kapitänleutnant Fritz Schneewind, she sailed through the Atlantic and around the Cape of Good Hope into the Indian Ocean where she made two kills.

The first attack was made at 09:42 on 27 June, when she hit the unescorted 7,194 GRT American Liberty ship  with two torpedoes, disabling the engines and killing an officer and two men. The survivors abandoned ship in five lifeboats. Ten minutes after being hit, the ship sank. The U-boat surfaced and questioned the survivors before leaving. The lifeboats lost contact with each other, but all were eventually rescued by Allied ships, apart from one boat which made its own way to Madagascar. Her second success came on 9 July when she torpedoed the 7,176 GRT American Liberty ship , loaded with 5,644 tons of ammunition and general cargo. The U-boat dived after firing and did not directly observe the results, but heard underwater explosions. On surfacing they saw no trace of the ship, only floating debris. There were no survivors from the 75 men on board. The ship was reported missing, and was at first believed to have been sunk by a Japanese surface raider. On 30 September, wreckage from the ship was discovered off the Maldives.

The U-boat arrived at Kure on 7 August after a voyage lasting 90 days and was handed over to Japan on 16 September.

Fate

In 2018, an expedition led by the Society La Plongee for Deep Sea Technology discovered the wrecks of Ro-500 and I-121 in Wakasa Bay off the coast of Kyoto Prefecture.

Summary of raiding history

References

Bibliography

External links

 Submarine RO-500: Tabular Record of Movement
 Japanese–German pre–World War II industrial co-operation

German Type IX submarines
U-boats commissioned in 1941
U-boats scuttled in 1946
Maritime incidents in 1946
Indian Ocean U-Boats
World War II submarines of Germany
World War II submarines of Japan
Foreign submarines of the Imperial Japanese Navy
1941 ships
Ships built in Hamburg
Shipwrecks in the Sea of Japan